Code page 895 (CCSID 895) is a 7-bit character set and is Japan's national ISO 646 variant. It is the Roman set (first or left half) of the JIS X 0201 (formerly JIS C 6220) Japanese Standard and is variously called Japan 7-Bit Latin, JISCII, JIS Roman, JIS C6220-1969-ro, ISO646-JP or Japanese-Roman. Its ISO-IR registration number is 14.

Amongst IBM's code pages, it accompanies code page 896 (half-width katakana), which encodes the Kana set of JIS X 0201 with extensions, and code page 897 which encodes the 8-bit form of JIS X 0201. It is used in Unix-like systems and, when combined with code page 896 and the 2-byte IBM code page 952 and code page 953, makes up the four code-sets of code page 954, one of IBM's versions of EUC-JP.

Codepage layout

See also 
 Shift JIS

References 

895